Po Toi (commonly , originally ) is the main island of the Po Toi Islands and the southernmost island of Hong Kong, with an area of 3.69 km².

Name
It is said that the island used to produce dried seaweeds, which were shaped like the cattail hassock used by the monks for sitting; therefore the island was originally called 蒲苔島, the present common name being a corruption. Another explanation states that Po Toi looks like a floating platform when viewed from a distance on sea. 蒲 is another character meaning "to float" in the local dialect, thus giving the island its name.

History
The island historically had a maximum of about 1,000 fishermen and farmers, whose economic activity consisted mainly of fishing, farming and seaweed harvesting. The population lived mainly in two villages, Chang Shek Pai and Shan Liu. The population decreased sharply over the past decades, with the younger generations moving to the city.

Features
Po Toi is famous for its rock formations, such as the Buddha's Palm Cliff, the Coffin Rock, the Tortoise Rock and the Monk Rock.

Ancient rock carvings on the island, believed to date back to the Bronze Age (around 1500–700 BC), were discovered in the 1960s. They have been listed as declared monuments of Hong Kong since 1979. These may be viewed on a spur-track on the track that runs between the main harbour (Tai Wan), and the lighthouse.

A Tin Hau Temple is located on Po Toi, facing the bay of Tai Wan. While its construction date is unknown, it is documented that the temple was renovated in 1893.

Mo's Old House, or the "Deserted Mansion of Family Mo", usually referred to as the "Haunted House", is a popular venue of "adventure" for the young visitors. The existing house was built in the 1930s at Chang Shek Pai and has fallen into ruins.

There is a lighthouse on Po Toi also known as Nam Kok Tsui Lighthouse.

Administration
Po Toi is a recognized village under the New Territories Small House Policy.

Transport
The island is accessible by kai-to or water taxi. Tsui Wah Ferry provides scheduled ferry services connecting Po Toi Island with Aberdeen and Stanley.

Education
Po Toi Island is in Primary One Admission (POA) School Net 96, which contains a single aided school, Northern Lamma School on Lamma Island; no government primary schools are in this net.

In fiction
The climax of John le Carré's novel The Honourable Schoolboy (the second in the 'Karla trilogy', featuring George Smiley) takes place on Po Toi.

See also

 2014 Po Toi Island ship collision

References

External links

 Delineation of area of existing village Po Toi (Lamma South) for election of resident representative (2019 to 2022)
 Pictures of Po Toi Island:     
 CentaMap map of Po Toi Island
 
 Hong Kong Bird Watching Society: Proposal for a Site of Special Scientific Interest and Support for Country Park Designation on Po Toi Island, October 2012

Islands of Hong Kong
Islands District
Po Toi Islands
Populated places in Hong Kong